Kokubu Station (国分駅) is the name of two train stations in Japan:

 Kokubu Station (Kagawa)
 Kokubu Station (Kagoshima)